Kamau Mbonisi Kwame Agyeman, known professionally by his stage name, KAMAUU (formerly KAMAU and brother KAMAU), is an American singer and rapper based in Brooklyn, New York City. He released his debut EP, A Gorgeous Fortune, in 2016. His most recent project, an EP called TheKAMAUU-CASSETTE: MíXD GRēēNS, came out in July 2019 on Atlantic Records.

Early life and education

Kamau Mbonisi Kwame Agyeman was born in Washington, D.C. and grew up in Prince George's County, Maryland. His parents introduced him and his two siblings to music at a young age. His older brother is a fellow musician who goes by the stage name, Nkō Khélí. As a child, Agyeman attended school at the Ujamaa Shule in Washington which is described as the "oldest completely independent Afrikan-centered school in the United States". While at the school, he was exposed to a variety of traditional African instruments like the djembe, and he studied African music, history, and culture. In 2009, he moved to Brooklyn, New York where he began attending the Pratt Institute to study film. While at Pratt, he met other musicians and artists and was introduced to the artist collective, BiGCiTYBiGCiTY. Members of the collective helped him hone his musical skills. He later graduated from Pratt in 2014. Though he was born in DC he is a NY based artist with highly experimental sound.

Career

In February 2014, KAMAUU released a mixtape called TheKAMAU-CASSETTE. In 2015, Agyeman received recognition for his song covers including those for Outkast's "Hey Ya!" and Adele's "Hometown Glory". In May 2016, he released a video for his song, "Jambo". The video was the first in a six-part series of films that would be made for each song on his A Gorgeous Fortune EP. Another single (and its accompanying video) from that collection called "Jusfayu" (featuring No Wyld) was released in June 2016. It would go on to be featured on an episode of the HBO series, Insecure and on the soundtrack for FIFA 17. It has also accumulated over 10 million streams on various platforms as of August 2019. A remix of the song by Lion Babe was released later in June 2016. A Gorgeous Fortune itself came out in July 2016 on Invisible Firm and was followed by a KAMAUU summer tour with Lion Babe.

In 2016, KAMAUU helped co-found "DoloBhana", a multi-disciplinary artist collective that was based in an apartment in Crown Heights, Brooklyn. In October 2016, KAMAUU was featured on the soundtrack for the film, The Birth of a Nation, with the song, "The Icarus". The following month, he released the single, "MĭNT" featuring Talibah Safiya. The music video for that song came out in January 2017. It would serve as the lead single for his second mixtape entitled TheKAMAU-CASSETTE: ŭRTH GōLD which was released in September 2017. In February 2018, he was featured on the Kota the Friend song, "Black Sheep". In March of that year, KAMAUU was featured on the Topaz Jones track, "Pleasure Pain Passion". Later that month, he played a show in Nairobi, Kenya at the Thrift Social installation.

After a year, he returned with the track "Patiently" as part of the collaborative project, Splash Brothers, which also features Allan Kingdom, Topaz Jones, Haile Supreme, and SIIMBA SELASSIIE. In May 2019 he began using his current stage name, KAMAUU, and was featured on the Marques Martin song, "Dinner Date". The following month he was featured on the Stella Santana song, "Tell The Truth". In July of that year, he released a four-track EP entitled TheKAMAUU-CASSETTE: MíXD GRēēNS. Music videos for two of the EP's songs ("clover" and "bamboo") were released the following month.

Discography

Mixtapes

EPs

Singles

References

External links
Official website

Living people
Atlantic Records artists
Rappers from Washington, D.C.
Singers from Maryland
Rappers from Maryland
Pratt Institute alumni
Rappers from Brooklyn
American hip hop record producers
Year of birth missing (living people)